Tom Dallas (born 23 April 1985) is a British former professional boxer who competed from 2008 to 2017.

Professional career
Dallas fought on the undercard of Wladimir Klitschko vs. Bryant Jennings and was part of the international television broadcast.  In that fight he lost by way of a first round TKO to Charles Martin for the NABO Heavyweight Title.

Dallas also fought in the Prizefighter series.

Professional boxing record

References

External links 

1985 births
English male boxers
Heavyweight boxers
Living people
Prizefighter contestants